Brookula megaumbilicata is a species of sea snail, a marine gastropod mollusk unassigned in the superfamily Seguenzioidea.

Description
The maximum recorded size of the shell is 1.54 mm.

Distribution
This species occurs in the Atlantic Ocean off Brazil, found at depths between 1195 m and 1222 m.

References

 Bouchet, P.; Fontaine, B. (2009). List of new marine species described between 2002-2006. Census of Marine Life.

megaumbilicata
Gastropods described in 2005